Mamunul Islam Mamun() (born 12 December 1988) is a Bangladeshi professional footballer who last played as a midfielder for Bangladesh Premier League side Fortis FC and also played for the Bangladesh national football team during 2009-2020.

He has won five league titles with three clubs. Mamunul started his career at Brothers Union as a central midfielder. After spending a season, he moved to Abahani Limited Dhaka in 2008–09 season and became league champion with Sky Blue Brigade. He joined Mohammedan SC Dhaka the following season. For 2010–11 season, Mamunul moved to Sheikh Jamal Dhanmondi Club and won his second league title. Leaving Sheikh Jamal Dhanmondi Club after 2011–12 season, he played the next season for Muktijoddha Sangsad KC. Then he joined Sheikh Russel KC and won his third league title. Again in 2013–14 season he returned to Sheikh Jamal Dhanmondi Club and won two more league titles in 2013-14 and 2014–15 season. In the middle of this quest, Atletico de Kolkata signed Mamunul on loan from Sheikh Jamal Dhanmondi Club to play the inaugural season of Indian Super League. After returning to Sheikh Jamal Dhanmondi Club, later he joined his hometown club Chittagong Abahani Limited for a record transfer fee in 2016. After spending two seasons there, the midfielder returned to Abahani Limited Dhaka in 2018. On 6 September 2020, he announced his retirement from international football.

Career

Brothers Union
Mamunul started his career in Brothers Union as a central midfielder in 2007–08 season.

Abahani Limited Dhaka
Mamunul moved to Abahani Limited Dhaka in 2008–09 season and became the league champion in that season.

Mohammedan SC
After winning league title with Abahani he moved to their arch-rival Mohammedan SC in 2009–10 season and won Federation Cup and Super Cup with them.

Sheikh Jamal Dhanmondi Club
Mamunul moved to Sheikh Jamal Dhanmondi Club from Dhaka Mohammedan SC in 2010–11 season. In his first season with Sheikh Jamal DC he became the league champion.

Muktijoddha Sangsad KC
Mamunul played 2011–12 season for Muktijoddha Sangsad KC.

Sheikh Russel KC
Mamunul went to Sheikh Russel KC from Muktijoddha Sangsad KC. And won the league, Federation Cup and Independence Cup in 2012–13 season.

Sheikh Jamal Dhanmondi Club
2013–14 season Mamunul returned to Sheikh Jamal DC. The club became the league champion under Mamunul's captaincy. His success at the club continued as they went on to win the league again in 2014–15 season.

Chittagong Abahani Limited
Ending his stint at Sheikh Jamal DC Mamunul Islam joined his hometown club, Chittagong Abahani on a national record fee of taka 65 lakh. He played two seasons there. And he captained the team in his first season.

Abahani Limited Dhaka
After ten long years at several clubs, Mamunul finally returned to Sky Blue Brigade in 2018. He played a veteran role in the team  and helped them with his vast experience.

Mohammedan SC
On 17 November 2021, Mamunul returned to Dhaka Mohammedan SC after 11 years.

Rahmatganj MFS
On 17 April 2022, Mamunul joined relegation fighting Rahmatganj MFS.

Indian Super League
Mamunul played in the first season of Indian Super League for Atlético de Kolkata, he went to the club on a 3 months loan from Sheikh Jamal Dhanmondi Club. He is the only South Asian player outside India who was signed in the first season of the league. He impressed Indian football fans in 2014 IFA Shield by taking Sheikh Jamal Dhanmondi Club(one of three foreign clubs participating in the tournament) to the finals. But Mamunul didn't get a chance to start for Atlético de Kolkata in ISL.

International Goals

Sheikh Jamal Dhanmondi Club

Abahani Limited Dhaka

Olympic Team

Senior Team

Honours
Abahani Limited
 Bangladesh Premier League: 2008–09
 Federation Cup: 2018

Mohammedan Sporting Club 
 Federation Cup: 2009
 Super Cup: 2009

Sheikh Russel KC
 Bangladesh Premier League: 2012–13
 Federation Cup:2012
 Independence Cup: 2012–13

Sheikh Jamal Dhanmondi Club
 Bangladesh Premier League: 2010–11, 2013–14, 2014–15
 Federation Cup: 2013–14, 2014–15

Chittagong Abahani Limited
 Independence Cup: 2016

 Atlético de Kolkata
Indian Super League: 2014

Bangladesh U-23
South Asian Games Gold medal: 2010

References

Living people
1988 births
People from Chittagong
Bangladeshi footballers
Bangladesh international footballers
Expatriate footballers in India
Bangladeshi expatriate sportspeople in India
Bangladeshi expatriate footballers
Bangladesh Football Premier League players
Indian Super League players
ATK (football club) players
Abahani Limited (Dhaka) players
Mohammedan SC (Dhaka) players
Sheikh Russel KC players
Muktijoddha Sangsad KC players
Sheikh Jamal Dhanmondi Club players
Rahmatganj MFS players
Association football central defenders
Footballers at the 2010 Asian Games
Footballers at the 2014 Asian Games
Asian Games competitors for Bangladesh
South Asian Games gold medalists for Bangladesh
South Asian Games medalists in football